Herrera (Entre Ríos) is a municipality in the Gená district of the Uruguay department in the province of  Entre Ríos in north-eastern Argentina. The municipality includes the locality of the same name - also known as Villa San Miguel - and a rural area. Its railway station is called Nicolás Herrera.

References

Populated places in Entre Ríos Province